Alibey is a village in the District of Kızılcahamam, Ankara Province, Turkey. As of 2000, it had a population of 62 people.

References

Villages in Kızılcahamam District